The 2016 European U23 Wrestling Championships was the 2nd edition of European U23 Wrestling Championships of combined events, and took place from 29 March to 3 April in Ruse, Bulgaria.

Medal table

Team ranking

Medal summary

Men's freestyle

Men's Greco-Roman

Women's freestyle

References

External links 

2016 in European sport
European Wrestling U23 Championships
International wrestling competitions hosted by Bulgaria